Ryan Bonni (born February 18, 1979) is a Canadian former professional ice hockey defenceman who played three games in the National Hockey League with the Vancouver Canucks. The majority of his career was spent in the minor leagues of North America, followed by several years in various European leagues.

Playing career
Bonni was born in Winnipeg, Manitoba. A hard-nosed physical defender, Bonni was selected in the 2nd round (34th overall) of the 1997 NHL Entry Draft. He signed with the Canucks and turned pro in 1999, and had a solid first professional season with the Syracuse Crunch of the AHL, recording 18 points and 125 penalty minutes in 71 games, and earned a callup to the NHL for the Canucks playing in three games during the 1999–2000 season.

However, he would struggle over the next two seasons, and by 2001–02 season he was demoted to the Columbia Inferno of the ECHL, Vancouver's secondary affiliate. Prior to the 2002–03 season, he was dealt to the Toronto Maple Leafs and spent a season in their minor-league system playing for the St. John's Maple Leafs. He has since played in various pro leagues, and spent the 2007–08 season with Soenderjyske of the Danish Elite League.

Nearing the end of his professional career, he played for Alba Volan Szekesfehervar of the Austrian League in 2008–09 and joined in July 2009 to SG Pontebba.

Post career
Following his playing career, he coached the River East Royal Knights of the MMJHL for 6 years and, as of 2016, is an assistant coach with the University of Manitoba Bisons.

Career statistics

Regular season and playoffs

References

External links

1979 births
Fehérvár AV19 players
Canadian expatriate ice hockey players in Austria
Canadian expatriate sportspeople in Denmark
Canadian expatriate sportspeople in Italy
Canadian ice hockey defencemen
Ice hockey people from Winnipeg
Kansas City Blades players
EV Landshut players
Las Vegas Wranglers players
Living people
Manitoba Moose players
SønderjyskE Ishockey players
St. John's Maple Leafs players
Syracuse Crunch players
Vancouver Canucks draft picks
Vancouver Canucks players
Canadian expatriate ice hockey players in Hungary
Canadian expatriate ice hockey players in Germany